Queen Karomama I was an Egyptian queen, married to Osorkon II.  She was part of the Twenty-second Dynasty of Egypt.

Family
Karomama was likely a daughter of Pharaoh Takelot I. She was one of three known wives of Osorkon II. The other wives being Isetemkheb G and Djedmutesankh iv.

Karomama was the mother of at least two sons and three daughters:
 Prince Shoshenq D, was High Priest of Ptah
 Prince Hornakht was the High Priest of Amun in Tanis. He was buried in his father's tomb at Tanis, having died at the age of ca 8 or 9 years old.
 Princess Tashakheper may have served as God's Wife of Amun during the reign of Takelot III
 Princess Karomama C, who may be identical to Karomama Meritmut, a God's Wife of Amun
 Princess

Biography
Osorkon II had many buildings raised during his reign, including a detailed monumental red granite hall in the 22nd year of his reign. Relief images of him and Queen Karomama decorate the walls.
Queen Karomama (also known as Karoama B) was also a Royal daughter, but it is unclear which King was her father. As she is not titled Royal Sister, one can assume she was not Takeloth I's daughter, but the lack of the title King's Sister is not conclusive. Other candidates are Shoshenq II or Harsiese.

References

External links 
 Page dedicated to Osorkon II with material on Queen Karomama I, including a photograph of a relief

9th-century BC Egyptian women
Queens consort of the Twenty-second Dynasty of Egypt
Year of birth unknown
Place of birth unknown
Year of death unknown
Place of death unknown
9th-century BC Egyptian people